This is a list of people from Mississauga, Ontario. The list includes people from Toronto Township, the Village and Town of Port Credit, and the Village and Town of Streetsville, predecessors of the modern community.

A

 Tariq Abdelhaleem (born 1948), Egyptian Islamist cleric
 Ibrahim Aboud, suspect, charges dropped
 Carolyn Abraham (born 1968), freelance journalist and author, finalist for the 2002 Governor General's Awards
 Eve Adams (born 1974), politician
 Jeff Adams (born 1970), business person, former Paralympic and Olympic competitor
 Anthony Patrick Cawthra Adamson (1906–2002), heritage planning
 Daniel Adeboboye (born 1999), CFL football player
 Vik Adhopia, CBC Radio reporter
 Natey Adjei (born 1989), CFL football player
 James Cox Aikins (1823–1904), federal politician, Lieutenant Governor of Manitoba
 Kate Aitken (1891–1971), broadcaster and homemaking expert
 Omar Alghabra (born 1969), federal politician
 Elyse Allan (born 1956 or 1957), C.M., M.B.A., LL.D. (Hon.), President and CEO of GE Canada, champion of scientific literacy, particularly among girls
 Amanda Allen (born 2005), League1 Ontario soccer player
 Bobby Allen (born 1969), retired basketball player
 Charles Allen (born 1977), athlete
 Stella Ambler (born 1966), federal politician
 Laeticia Amihere (born 2001), basketball player, Olympian
 Greg Anaka (died 1976), C.M., minor hockey organizer
 Deepak Anand, MPP Mississauga-Malton
 Adrian Anantawan (born 1983), violinist
 Anders (born  or 1996), R&B singer and songwriter
 Bianca Andreescu (born 2000), tennis player, 2019 US Open winner, first male or female player representing Canada to win a Grand Slam singles title
 Danny Antonucci (born 1957), animator
 Natalie Appleton (born 1973), singer, actress
 Mary Ashun (born 1968), educator, author and researcher
 Larry Attard (born 1951), horse trainer, retired Hall of Fame Champion jockey
 Antwi Atuahene (born 1984), NBLC basketball player
 Anthony Aquino (born 1982), ice hockey player
 Luciano Aquino (born 1985), hockey player, Erste Bank Eishockey Liga
 Cathy Auld (born 1971), curler, skips at Mississaugua Golf & Country Club
 Mona Awad (born 1978), novelist, short story writer

B

 Kelly Babstock (born 1992), NCAA and NWHL ice hockey player
 Amir Bageria (born 2000), actor, Degrassi: The Next Class
 Devon Bailey (born 1991), Canadian football player
 Jasmine Baird (born 1999), snowboarder
 Marika Bakewell (born 1985), curler
 Alyssa Baldin (born 1990), ice hockey player and inline hockey player
 Al Balding (1924–2006), golfer
 Robert W. Ball (born 1943), yacht designer
 Jill Barber (born 1980), singer-songwriter
 Matthew Barber (born 1977), singer-songwriter
 RJ Barrett (born 2000), basketball player
 Danuta Bartoszek (born 1961), former Olympic marathon runner
 Evert Bastet (born 1950), sailing
 Matt Beca (born 1986), EIHL ice hockey player
 Marko Bedenikovic (born 1984), former soccer player
 Adriano Belli (born 1977), food processing businessperson, former CFL and NFL football player
 Katrina Bellio (born 2004), freestyle swimmer, Olympian
 Sophie Bennett (born 1989), actress (Saddle Club seasons 1 & 2)
 Craig Bernard, film director and producer
 Francis Marion Beynon (1884–1951), journalist, feminist, pacifist
 Lillian Beynon Thomas (1884–1961), journalist, feminist
 Jack Bickell (1884–1951), businessman, philanthropist, and sports team owner
 Don Biederman (1940–1999), stock car racer
 Don Biggs (born 1965), retired ice hockey player
 Leading Seaman Robert Binder MB (1989–2010), Canadian Forces Naval Reserve, posthumously awarded the Medal of Bravery
 Art Binkowski (born 1975), super heavyweight boxer
 Courtney Birchard (born 1989), Canadian national ice hockey player
 David Blackwood (born 1941), printmaker, artist in residence at the University of Toronto's Erindale College (1969–1975)
 Fito Blanko, Panamanian-Canadian singer/songwriter
 Michelle Bonello (born 1985), ice hockey player and inline hockey player
 Robert Boskovic (born 1998), USL soccer player
 Jaime Bourbonnais (born 1998), ice hockey player
 Johnny Bower (1924–2017), Hockey Hall of Fame goalie for the Toronto Maple Leafs
 Cory Boyd (born 1985), CFL football player
 Brad Boyes (born 1982), NHL player
 Harold M. Brathwaite (1940–2020), O Ont., education
 Juwan Brescacin (born 1993), CFL football player
 Brandon Bridge (born 1992), CFL football player
 William Briggs (1836–1922), Methodist minister and publisher
 Alysha Brilla (born 1988), Tanzanian-Canadian blues and jazz singer
 Dejon Brissett (born 1996), CFL football player
 David Broll (born 1993), ECHL ice hockey player
 Dillon Brooks (born 1996), NBA basketball player
 Andre Brown (born 1990), volleyball player
 Jeff Brown (born 1978), ice hockey player
 Kevin Brown (born 1974), ice hockey player
 Patrick Brown (born 1978), former leader of the Progressive Conservative Party of Ontario, former MPP for Simcoe North
 Ward Bowlby (1834–1917), lawyer and politician
 Juwan Brescacin (born 1993), CFL football player
 Dejon Brissett, football wide receiver
 Gord Brydson (1907–2001), NHL ice hockey player
 Dan Bryk (born 1970), singer-songerwriter
 Kadeisha Buchanan (born 1995), soccer player
 Leya Buchanan (born 1996), track and field sprinter
 Francis (Frank) C. Buckley, C.M., B.Comm. (1921–2016), businessperson
 Attila Buday (born 1974), sprint canoer
 Tamas Buday Jr. (born 1976), C-2 canoe
 Mike Bullard (born 1957), comedian, radio and television personality
 Pat Bullard (born 1959), writer and comedian
 Tony Burgess (born 1959), novelist and screenwriter
 Jacqueline Byers (born 1996), actress

C

 Marcus Caldeira (born 2004), CPL and League1 Ontario soccer player
 Katrina Cameron (born 1995), Olympic rhythmic gymnast
 Tiffany Cameron (born 1991), soccer player, German Bundesliga and Canada women's national soccer team
 Ivan Camilleri (born 1969), Maltese-Canadian Catholic priest, auxiliary bishop–elect of the Archdiocese of Toronto
 Nikki Campbell (born 1980), golfer
 Kyle Capobianco (born 1997), AHL ice hockey player
 Alessia Cara (born 1996), singer and songwriter
 Anthony Carelli (born 1974), professional wrestler, competes as Santino Marella for World Wrestling Entertainment
 Jacob Carlos (born 2001), CPL soccer player
 Gordon Carton (born 1921), former MPP
 Michael Caruso (born 1988), EBEL ice hockey player
 Claire Carver-Dias (born 1977), synchronized swimmer
 Jack Cassar (born 1997), CFL football player
 Sebastian Castello (born 2003), CPL soccer player
 Jennifer Castle, folk singer-songwriter
 Mabel Cawthra (1871–1943), painter, decorator
 Klaidi Cela (born 1999), soccer player
 David Celia, musician
 Carlton Chambers (born 1975), track and field athlete 
 Samantha Chang (born 2000), soccer player
 Hyliard Chappell (1916–1988), politician, MP and councillor
 Al Cherney (1932–1989), fiddle player
 Don Cherry (born 1934), hockey commentator
 Kenneth Chisholm (1829–1906), businessman, MPP
 Deborah Chow, filmmaker, director, screenwriter
 Casey Cizikas (born 1991), hockey player for the New York Islanders
 Lou Clare (1950–2017), CFL football player
 Adrian Clarke (born 1991), CFL football linebacker
 Dameon Clarke (born 1972), actor, voice actor
 Paul Coffey (born 1961), Hockey Hall of Fame inductee and hockey great
 Enzo Concina (born 1962), retired soccer player
 Kate Conway (born 1986), actress
 Nesta Cooper (born 1993), actress
 Chris Corbeil (born 1988), NLL lacrosse player
 Matt Corrente (born 1988), hockey player for the New Jersey Devils
 Peter deCarteret Cory,  (1925–2020), former puisne judge of the Supreme Court of Canada (1989 to 1999)
 Anthony Cosmo (born 1977), NLL goaltender for the Boston Blazers
 John Coyne (1836–1873), barrister, MPP
 Dominic Cozzolino (born 1994), sledge ice hockey
 Stephen Crawford, MPP for Oakville
 Brittany Crew (born 1994), shot put athlete
 Bonnie Crombie (born 1960), politician
 Kyle Croxall (born 1988), 2012 Crashed Ice world champion
 Gord Cruickshank (1965–2021), NCAA ice hockey forward, NHL drafted
 Bob Cunningham (1927–2006), CFL football fullback
 Rudy Cuzzetto, MPP for Mississauga-Lakeshore

D

 Robin D'Abreo (born 1975), field hockey player
 Chris D'Alvise (born 1986), EBEL ice hockey player
 Kunle Dada-Luke (born 2000), soccer player
 André Dae Kim (born 1996), actor and writer
 Dipika Damerla, MPP for Mississauga East—Cooksville
 Fedir Danylak (born 1955), dancer, balletmaster, choreographer and artistic director
 Mackenzie Darragh (born 1993), Olympic swimmer
 James Day (born 1946), equestrian jumping
 Bob Dechert, politician
 Vincenzo DeMaria (born 1954), mob boss, Siderno Group
 Peter Demeter (born 1933), murderer, former real estate developer
 Shawn Desman (born 1982, as Shawn Bosco Fernandes), singer and entertainer
 Ranjeev Deol (born 1976), field hockey
 Duncan R. Derry (died 1987), O.C., Ph.D., F.R.S.C., economic geologist
 Jamie Devane (born 1991), NHL drafted AHL player
 Sudarshan Devanesen (born 1943), C.M., M.D., former Chief of Family and Community Medicine at St. Michael's Hospital in Toronto
 Devon (born , Devon Martin), rapper
 Adrian Dingle (1911–1974), cartoonist and artist, best known for creating Nelvana of the Northern Lights
 Anne Ditchburn (born 1949), ballet dancer and choreographer, actress
 Martin Dobkin (born 1942), mayor of Mississauga, family doctor
 Denny Doherty (1940–2007), The Mamas and Papas, moved to Park Royal in 1986 to live and work, later Lorne Park
 Manning Doherty (1875–1938), Ontario Minister of Agriculture
 Richard Dos Ramos (born 1962), jockey in Thoroughbred horse racing
 Jennifer Douglas (born 1974), archivist
 Dick Duff (born 1936), former professional hockey player, and Hockey Hall of Fame inductee
 Vince Dunn (born 1996), NHL hockey player
 Jordan Dunstan (born 1993), soccer player
 Andre Durie (born 1981), CFL football player, slotback, Jake Gaudaur Veterans' Award
 Sean Durzi (born 1998), NHL ice hockey defenseman

E
.
 Chuck Ealey (born 1950), former CFL football player
 Robert Young Eaton (1875–1956), businessman
 Dwight Edwards (born 1954), retired CFL football player
 William Elliott (1837–1888), Member of Parliament, farmer, merchant
 Rik Emmett (born 1953), musician
 JD Era (born 1985), rapper

F

 Robby Fabbri (born 1996), ice hockey player, currently with the St. Louis Blues
 Darrell Faria, actor, director, comedian
 Joseph Featherston (1843–1913), Member of Parliament, municipal politician, livestock association board member, farmer
 Ron Fellows (born 1959), NASCAR driver
 Wayne Fernandes (born 1978), field hockey
 Yanga R. Fernández (born 1971), astronomer
 Ricardo Ferreira (born 1992), Primeira Liga football player
 Massimo Ferrin (born 1998), USL Championship soccer player
 Jonelle Filigno (born 1990), soccer player, Olympics and National Women's Soccer League
 Caleb Flaxey (born 1983), curler, 2014 Sochi Olympic alternate; Caledon resident, his rink is Dixie Curling Club
 James C. Floyd (born 1914), aerospace engineer, Avro Aircraft Ltd. (Canada) chief design engineer
 Renee Foessel (born 1995), parasport discus throw athlete
 Peter Fonseca (born 1966), politician
 Kyle Forgeard (born 1994), YouTuber
 J.D. Fortune (born 1973), musician, former frontman of INXS
 Magdalena Frąckowiak (born 1984), Polish fashion model and jewelry designer
 Giuliano Frano (born 1993), USL soccer player
 Paul Fromm (born 1949), white supremacist

G

 William James Gage (1849–1921), educator, publisher, philanthropist
 Iqwinder Gaheer, Member of Parliament
 Greg Gardner (born 1975), ice hockey coach (AHA), former goaltender
 Ali Gatie (born 1997), rapper, singer, songwriter
 Jessica Gaudreault (born 1994), water polo player
 Robyn Gayle (born 1985), Olympic soccer player
 Ahmad Ghany (born 1984), alleged terrorist
 Joel Gibb (born 1977), musician
 Brad K. Gibson, astrophysicist, academic
 John Morrow Godfrey (1912–2001), pilot, lawyer, Senator
 Gary Pig Gold (born 1955), singer-songwriter, record producer, filmmaker, author
 Charles Goldhamer (1903–1985), war artist
 Hank Goldup (1918–2008), NHL ice hockey player
 Ana Golja (born 1996), actor, Degrassi
 Cindy Gomez, singer
 Gigi Gorgeous (born 1992), actress, internet personality, makeup artist, activist, and model
 Igor Gouzenko (1919–1982), defected cipher clerk for the Soviet Embassy to Canada
 Gerry Gray (born 1961), soccer coach, former Canadian national team player
 Gordon Graydon (1896–1953), MP and UN representative for Canada
 Jayden Greig (born 2003), actor
 Albina Guarnieri (born 1953), former politician
 Iohan Gueorguiev (1988–2021), long-distance bikepacker

H

 Ntore Habimana (born 1997), CEBL basketball player
 Donald Haddow (born 1970), former Olympic freestyle swimmer
 Tariq Abdul Haleem, Egyptian Islamist cleric, praised by the leader of Al-Qaeda
 Sherman Hamilton (born 1972), basketball player, television personality, raised in Malton
 Ken Hammond (born 1963), former NHL ice hockey player
 Melvin Ormond Hammond (1876–1934), journalist and photographer
 Macklin Leslie Hancock (1925–2010), O Ont, urban planning
 Basil (Buzz) Hargrove (born 1944), O.C., LL.D., former President of the Canadian Auto Workers union
 Winnie Harlow (born 1994), model
 Glen Harmon (1921–2007), NHL ice hockey player
 Richard Harmon (born 1991), actor
 Jacqueline Harrison (born 1978), curler
 Daniel Harper (born 1989), track and field
 Jon Hartley (born 1989), economist
 Raye Hartmann (born 1990), CFL football player
 Vanessa Harwood (born 1947), ballet dancer, choreographer, artistic director, teacher, and actor
 Tarrah Harvey (born 1989), pairs ice dancer
 Farhat Hashmi (born 1957), Islamic scholar, founder of Mississauga's Al-Huda Institute
 Ronnie Hawkins, O.C. (born 1935), rockabilly musician
 Sandy Hawley (born 1949), jockey
 Daniel Hayes (born 1989), actor, boxer, MMA fighter
 Paul Henderson (born 1943), C.M., O.Ont., former NHL ice hockey player, motivational speaker, volunteer
 Curtis Hibbert (born 1966), stuntman, Olympic gymnast
 Blair Hicken (born 1965), Olympic swimmer
 Allison Higson (born 1973), Olympic swimmer
 Dwayne Hill (born 1966), voice actor
 Shawn Hill (born 1981), baseball player
 Charles Hill-Tout (1858–1944), ethnologist and folklorist
 Dave Hilton, Jr. (born 1963), former world boxing champion
 Flash Hollett (1911–1999), ice hockey player
 Karla Homolka (born 1970), notable rapist and serial killer
 Ed Hospodar (born 1959), former ice hockey player
 Samantha Holmes-Domagala (born 1977), ice hockey player
 Jonathan Hood (born 1985), CFL football defensive back
 Robert Horner (1932–2008), Member of Parliament for Mississauga North
 Caleb Houstan (born 2003), NBA drafted basketball player
 Malcolm Howard (born 1983), Olympic rower
 William Pearce Howland (1811–1907), second Lieutenant Governor of Ontario
 Darrin Huss (born 1965), singer
 Reverend Hyeon Soo Lim (born 1955), pastor previously imprisoned by North Korea

I

 Freddy Ibrahim (born 1996), basketball player, Jordanian national basketball team
 IllScarlett members
 Thomas Ingersoll (1749–1812), Justice of the Peace, hotel operator, father of Laura Secord
 Michael Ireland (born 1974), Olympic long track speed skater
 Sean Ireland (born 1969), speed skating coach, former Olympic speed skater
 Zunera Ishaq (born ), successfully challenged a law requiring people taking the Oath of Citizenship to have their identity visible, allowing her to wear a niqab

J

 Chuck Jackson (born 1953), lead singer, Downchild Blues Band
 Simeon Jackson (born 1987), footballer
 Ian James (born 1963), retired Olympic long jumper
 Ryan Lee James (born 1994), soccer player
 Stefan Janković (born 1993), basketball player
 Patti Jannetta, pop and rock singer
 Aditya Jha, C.M., M.Sc., LL.D., business, promotion of education and entrepreneurial opportunities for Aboriginal and disadvantaged youth
 Daniel Jodah (born 1995), League1 Ontario and Guyanese national team football player
 Prakash John (born 1947), rock & rhythm 'n blues bassist
 Ryan Johnson (born 1974), freestyle skier
 Isaiah Johnston (born 2001), CPL soccer player
 Kyle Jones (born 1986), retired CFL football player
 Peter Jones (1802–1856), Ojibwa Methodist minister, translator, chief and author
 Terry David Jones (1938–2014), MPP
 Leila Josefowicz (born 1977), violinist
 David Joseph, basketball coach
 Bill Joyce (born 1957), IHL ice hockey player
 Sandeep Jyoti (born 1973), cricketer

K

 Karen Kain (born 1951), CC, lived in Erindale Woodlands and Clarkson while attending the National Ballet School
 Ignat Kaneff (1926–2020), O Ont, developer and philanthropist
 Belinda Karahalios (born 1982), MPP for Cambridge
 Brittany Kassil (born 1991), rugby union player
 Douglas Kennedy (1916–2003), provincial politician
 Peter Kennedy (1943–2010), economist
 Thomas Laird Kennedy (1878–1959), politician, Premier of Ontario
 Jane Kerr (born 1968), Olympic swimmer
 Christina Kessler (born 1988), ice hockey player
 Iqra Khalid (born 1986), MP
 Irshad Khan (born ), Indian classical surbahar and sitar player
 Rich Kidd (born 1987), hip hop recording artist, record producer and film/video director, 2012 Juno Award nominee
 Deanna Klymkiw, clinical psychologist, former actress
 Dean Kondziolka (born 1972), swimmer
 Tom Kostopoulos (born 1979), ice hockey player
 Greg Kovacs (1968–2013), bodybuilder
 Maksym Kowal (born 1991), soccer player
 Benjamin Kowalewicz (born 1975), lead singer of Billy Talent
 Alison Kreviazuk (born 1988), curler
 Matt Kudu (born 1981), football player
 Nikolai Kulikovsky (1881–1958), second husband of Grand Duchess Olga Alexandrovna of Russia
 Natalia Kusendova, MPP for Mississauga Centre
 Jeff Kyrzakos (born 1985), hockey player, Central Hockey League

L

 Nathan LaFayette (born 1973), former ice hockey player
 Jack LaFontaine (born 1998), NHL drafted ice hockey goalie
 Tuan Lam (born 1966), professional poker player
 John Langstone (1913–1994), Anglican bishop
 Silken Laumann (born 1964), Olympic rower
 Alison Lee (born 1994), indoor hockey and field hockey player
 Chris Leroux (born 1984), retired baseball player, appearing in The Bachelor Canada
 Adriana Leon (born 1992), soccer player NWSL
 George Leslie Sr. (1804–1893), gardener, merchant, namesake of Toronto's Leslieville
 Janet Leung (born 1994), softball player, Olympian
 Winnie Leuszler (1926–2004), long-distance swimmer
 Jessica Cooper Lewis (born 1993), Bermudian Paralympic athlete
 Carrie Lightbound (born 1979), K-4 500 kayak
 Simu Liu (born 1989), actor, Kim's Convenience and Shang-Chi and the Legend of the Ten Rings
 Władysław Lizoń (born 1954), federal politician
 Erix Logan (born 1963, Enrico Del Buono), magician and illusionist
 Martina Lončar (born 1997), soccer player
 Naz Long (born 1993), college basketball player
 Cachet Lue (born 1997), soccer player, Jamaica women's national team
 Anqi Luo (born 1996), table tennis
 Henry Lau (born 1989), k-pop singer, actor

M

 Austin MacDonald (born 1995), actor, Debra!
 Byron MacDonald (born 1950), swimming coach, broadcaster, former Olympic swimmer
 Dr. Joseph B. MacInnis (born 1937), lived in Mineola as of 1965, physician, author, poet, underwater diver and aquanaut, first scientist to dive under the North Pole
 Robert MacGeorge (1808–1884), 19th century Anglican priest and author
 Brittany MacLean (born 1994), Olympic swimmer
 Heather MacLean (born 1992), Olympic swimmer
 Kiana Madeira (born 1992) actor
 Christine Magee (born 1959), OC, businessperson, notably Sleep Country Canada
 Dr. Hadi-Khan Mahabadi, OC, VP of Xerox Research Centre of Canada
 Steve Mahoney (born 1947), former MP and cabinet minister, former MPP
 Shaun Majumder (born 1972), comedian, born in Newfoundland, raised in Clarkson
 Matur Maker (born 1998), basketball player declared for the 2018 NBA Draft
 Manny Malhotra (born 1980), former hockey player for the Vancouver Canucks
 Ausma Malik (born 1983/1984), Toronto city councillor
 A. J. Mandani (born 1987), PBA basketball player
 Alan Mannus (born 1982), soccer goalkeeper
 Santino Marella (born 1974), professional wrestler, WWE
 Denis Margalik (born 1997), Argentine figure skater
 Margaret Marland (born 1934), politician
 Robert Marland (born 1964), realtor, retired Olympic rower
 Grant Marshall (born 1973), retired NHL ice hockey player
 Boman Martinez-Reid (known as Bomanizer), TikTok video creator
 Taya Marquis (born 1989), singer, songwriter
 Liam Massaubi, entrepreneur, business person and investor
 Shahir Massoud, chef and television personality
 Diana Matheson (born 1984), Olympic soccer player
 Joe Mattacchione (born 1975), USL A-League/NPSL soccer player
 Jeff Maund (born 1876), former ice hockey goaltender
 Ermanno Mauro (born 1939), O.C., tenor
 Gavin Maxwell (born 1970), Olympic spring canoe/kayaker
 Hazel McCallion, C.M. (1921–2023), politician, Mayor of Mississauga
 Gavin McCallum (born 1987), footballer
 Tom McCarthy (born 1960), NHL ice hockey player
 Joel McClintock (born 1960), former water skier
 Hatem McDadi (born 1960s), former professional tennis player
 Natassha McDonald (born 1997), athlete
 Norris McDonald (born 1942), journalist, member of the Canadian Motorsport Hall of Fame
 Wade McElwain (born 1972), television producer and comedian
 F.B. McFarren (1889–unknown), miller
 Andrew McGrath (born 1998), Australian rules footballer
 Blake McGrath (born 1983), dancer, singer, choreographer
 Seamus McGrath (born 1976), retired mountain biker
 Ruth Gowdy McKinley (1931–1981), ceramic artist
 Margaret McLeod OC (died 1993), founder of Cheshire Homes in Canada
 Michael McLeod (born 1998), OHL ice hockey
 Ryan McLeod (born 1999), NHL ice hockey player
 Mikael McNamara (born 1987), soccer player
 Suzie McNeil (born 1976), singer
 Danica McPhee (born 1989), member of Team Canada at the IPC's first women's sledge hockey tournament
 Richie Mehta, film director, Genie nominee
 Eddie Melo (1960–2001), boxer, gangster
 Ian Mendes (born 1976), sports broadcaster
 Tony Menezes (born 1974), soccer player
 Scott Middleton (born 1981), Guitarist of Cancer Bats, Record Producer, Engineer 
 Christin Milloy (born 1984), LGBT activist
 Nathan Mitchell (born 1988), actor, The Boys
 Shay Mitchell (born 1987), television actress, Pretty Little Liars
 Elijah Mitrou-Long (born 1996), basketball player
 Naz Mitrou-Long (born 1993), basketball player
 Stefan Molyneux (born 1966), author, essayist, philosopher, radio host
 Steve Montador (1979–2015), NHL ice hockey player
 Gil Moore (born 1953), Triumph
 Mishael Morgan (born 1986), Trinidadian born actress, The Young and the Restless
 Wesley Morgan (born 1990), actor
 Teddy Morris (1910–1965), Canadian Football Hall of Fame player and coach for the Toronto Argonauts
 Carmelina Moscato (born 1984), Olympic soccer player
 John Errington Moss (born 1940), author
 Ese Mrabure-Ajufo (born 1992), CFL football player
 Cauchy Muamba (born 1987), football player, CFL
 Henoc Muamba (born 1989), football player, NFL
 Peter Mueller (born 1951), football player, CFL, and educator
 Ryan Munce (born 1985), NHL drafted ACH ice hockey player
 Will Munro (1975–2010), artist, club promoter, and restaurateur
 Janet Murphy (born 1965), curler
 Jestyn Murphy (born ), curling skip
 Chic Murray (1914–1984), Mayor of the Town of Mississauga
 M. H. Murray (born 1993), writer, director, filmmaker, web series creator
 Alex Mustakas, actor and director, CEO of Drayton Entertainment
 Nadine Muzerall (born 1978), ice hockey player

N

 Nahnebahwequa ("Catherine Bunch"), Ojibwa spokeswoman and Christian missionary, born at Credit River flats
 Alexandra Najarro (born 1993), figure skater, trained at Mississauga Figure Skating Club
 Latif Nasser, researcher, writer, presenter
 Farah Nasser, newscaster
 Bo Naylor (born 2000), baseball catcher
 Josh Naylor (born 1997), baseball player
 Boyd Neel, conductor
 Neenyo (born Sean Seaton), record producer and songwriter
 Walt Neubrand, one of three Keepers of the Cup for the NHL
 Kevin Newman, broadcaster, journalist
 Andrew Nicholson (born 1989), NBA basketball player
 Bert Niosi (1909–1987), bandleader
 Devohn Noronha-Teixeira, field hockey player
 Elyse Null (born 1989, Elyse Hopfner-Hibbs), world-level gymnast

O 

 Matthew O'Connor (born 1984) soccer player
 Peanuts O'Flaherty (1918–2008), NHL ice hockey player (1940–1956)
 Bev Oda, former MP, cabinet minister
 Senator Victor Oh
 Grand Duchess Olga Alexandrovna of Russia (1882–1960), exiled child of Emperor Alexander III of Russia
 Tara Oram (born 1984), country music singer, lived in Malton
 Johnny Orlando (born 2003), singer, songwriter, actor, Juno Award nominee, MTV EMA awardee for best Canadian Act
 Philip Orsino, O.C., B.A., F.C.A., President and CEO of Masonite International Corporation, volunteer and fundraiser
 Kary Osmond (born 1979), celebrity chef, formerly of CBC's Best Recipes Ever

P 

 Lata Pada, C.M., M.A., South Asian dancer, instructor, choreographer
 John Pallett (1921–1985), politician
 Owen Pallett (born 1979), composer, violinist, keyboardist, and vocalist, also known as "Final Fantasy"
 Cyril Everard Palmer (1930–2013), Jamaican writer
 Dominic Panganiban (born 1990), YouTuber and animator
 Alex Pangman (born 1976), jazz singer
 Carolyn Parrish (born 1946), city councillor, former MP
 Aqsa Parvez (1991–2007), murdered by strangulation in "honour killing"
 PartyNextDoor (born 1993), Jahron Anthony Brathwaite, R&B Artist with OVO Sound
 Alan Paterson (1928–1999), British high jumper
 Claude Patrick (born 1980), mixed martial arts fighter
 Nick Paul (born 1995), NHL ice hockey player
 Larry Patey (born 1953), hockey player, NHL, raised in Port Credit
 Jerzy Patoła (1946–2016), Polish footballer
 Joevannie Peart (born 1984), former soccer player
 Erica Peck, stage actress; attended Cawthra's arts program and University of Toronto Mississauga
 Jordyn Pedersen (born 1997), retired artistic gymnast
 Bert Peer (1910–1992), NHL player
 Tina Pereira (born 1982 or 1983), ballet dancer
 Christopher Pellini (born 1984), canoe/kayak sprint
 Tina Pereira (born 1982 or 1983), ballet dancer
 Jackie Perez, video journalist, former Toronto Argonauts cheer captain
 Oscar Peterson CC CQ OOnt (1925–2007), jazz pianist
 Tim Peterson (born 1947), former politician
 Roméo Phillion (1939–2015), served 32 years on a wrongful conviction
 Phil X (born 1966), musician and songwriter
 George C. Pidgeon (1872–1971), Presbyterian and United Church minister
 Steve Pinizzotto (born 1984), ice hockey player
 Igor Pisanjuk (born 1989), soccer player
 Ed Podivinsky (born 1970), alpine skiing
 Dalton Pompey (born 1992), baseball, outfielder
 Kyle Porter (born 1990), USL soccer player
 Owen Power (born 2002), NHL ice hockey player
 E. J. Pratt (1882–1964), poet, served in Streetsville as an Assistant Minister
 Carlo Guillermo Proto (born 1979), Chilean-Canadian director

Q

 Maria Qamar, artist and author

R

 Tomasz Radzinski (born 1973), retired soccer player
 Deborah Raji, computer scientist
 John Ramage (born 1991), ice hockey player
 Maitreyi Ramakrishnan (born 2001), actress
 Sohail Rana (born 1938), composer for Pakistani films, runs a music school
 Kaleed Rasheed, MPP for Mississauga East-Cooksville
 Gino Reda (born 1960), television host
 Lesley Reddon (born 1970), former member of the Canadian women's ice hockey team
 Carolyn Relf, geologist
 Margaret Renwick (1923–2012), MPP Scarborough Centre
 Tyrell Richards (born 1998), CFL football linebacker
 Fran Rider, C.M., co-founder of the Ontario Women's Hockey Association
 John River (born 1994, as Matthew John Derrick-Huie), rapper
 Rebecca Rivera (born 1995), volleyball player
 John Roberts (born 1965), TV journalist, formerly known as J. D. Roberts
 John Beverley Robinson (1821–1896), mayor of Toronto, MP, Lieutenant Governor of Ontario
 Laura Robinson, sports journalist
 Mazo de la Roche (1879–1961), author
 Chaim Roserie (born 1998), soccer player
 Chris Rudge (born 1945), Toronto Argonauts executive, formerly with Canadian Olympic Committee, CFL
 Adamo Ruggiero (born 1986), actor
 Lorne Ryder (born 1970), singer-songwriter and instrumentalist

S

 Sheref Sabawy, MPP for Mississauga-Erin Mills
 Caryma Sa'd, lawyer, activist, cartoonist
 Rob Sampson, businessperson, former MPP, Minister of Correctional Services
 Sigmund Samuel (1868–1962), steel industry
 Harland David "Colonel" Sanders (1890–1980), founder of Kentucky Fried Chicken
 Scott Sandison, field hockey
 Ashlee Savona (born 1992), Canadian-born Guyanese women's international footballer
 Jessica Savona (born 1994), artistic gymnast
 Robert J. Sawyer, science fiction author
 Erica Scarff (born 1996), paracanoeist
 Kian Schaffer-Baker (born 1998), CFL wide receiver
 Kyle Schmid (born 1984), actor
 Charlotte Schreiber (1834–1922), artist
 Aaron Seltzer (born 1974), director and screenwriter team with Jason Friedberg, specializing in commercial successful parody films
 Alex Semenets (1990–2020), soccer player
 Derick Sequeira (born 1996), soccer player
 Wali Shah, musician and speaker
 Leanne Shapton (born 1973), artist and graphic novelist
 Janet Sheather (1912–?), Olympic swimmer
 Tara Shelley, actress
 Harold Shipp (1926–2014), developer, philanthropist
 Samantha Shirley (born 1983), former ice hockey player, former Canadian women's national inline hockey player
 Alexander MacDonald Shook (1888–1966), Canadian World War I flying ace
 Shroud (born 1994, Michael Grzesiek), former professional eSports player
 Matt Silva (born 1991), soccer player
 Lucas Silveira, vocalist, guitarist, songwriter, first openly transgender man signed to a major record label
 Bardia Sinaee, poet
 Meaghan Sittler (born 1976), NWHL ice hockey player
 Donna Smellie (born 1964), 1984 Olympic heptalthlete
 Blair Smith (born 1990), football linebacker
 Bob Smith, comic book artist
 Eric Smith, Taekwondo, canoe/kayak – sprint
 Jelani Smith (born 1991), soccer player
 Lorne Smith (1928–2002), AHL and Elite Ice Hockey League hockey player and coach
 Morag Smith, television comedian
 Robert Smith (1819–1900), politician and farmer
 Steve Smith, television comedian and producer, Red Green on The Red Green Show
 John Smits (born 1988), soccer player, North American Soccer League
 Aaron Solowoniuk (born 1974), drummer for Billy Talent
 Alexander Sowinski (born 1991), drummer, music producer
 Charles Sousa (born 1958), provincial politician, cabinet minister
 Kris Sparre (born 1987), DEL2 ice hockey player
 Robert Speck (1915–1972), politician
 Robert James Speers (1882–1955), businessman, Canadian Sports Hall of Fame inductee
 Sven Spengemann (born 1966), MP
 Jason Spezza, hockey player for the Toronto Maple Leafs
 Ryan Sproul (born 1993), hockey player, drafted by Detroit Red Wings
 Laura Stacey (born 1994), CWHL ice hockey player
 Matt Stajan, hockey player for the Calgary Flames
 Marina Stakusic (born 2004), tennis player
 Jim Stanfield (1947–2009), ice hockey player
 Joshua Stanford (born 1994), CFL football player
 Nik Stauskas, chosen 8th overall in the 2014 NBA Draft
 Tamara Steeves, Paralympic wheelchair basketball player
 Amanda Stepto (born 1970), actress (Degrassi Junior High, Degrassi High, Degrassi: The Next Generation).
 Roberto Stillo (born 1991), soccer player
 Dylan Strome (born 1997), hockey player for the Washington Capitals
 Ryan Strome, hockey player for the Anaheim Ducks
 Amanda Strong, media artist and filmmaker
 Dean Strong (born 1985), Italian Elite.A ice hockey player
 George Stroumboulopoulos (born 1972) television personality, Hockey Night in Canada
 Cameron Sylvester (born 1986), Olympic rower
 Krisztina Szabo, mezzo-soprano

T

 Harinder Takhar, provincial politician
 Nina Tangri, MPP for Mississauga-Streetsville
 Tony Tanti, NHL player
 John Tavares, hockey player for the Toronto Maple Leafs 
 John Tavares, NLL lacrosse player
 Matthew Tavares (born 1990), musician, songwriter, music producer
 Raheem Taylor-Parkes (born 1998), soccer player
 Kat Teasdale (1964–2016), racecar driver
 Jay Telfer (1947–2009), singer, songwriter, guitarist
 Ty Templeton, comic book artist
 Louis Temporale (1909–1994), O Ont, stone sculptor
 Aria Tesolin, opera singer
 Ian Tetley (born 1962), curler
 Elias Theodorou (born 1988), UFC Fighter
 Diane Therrien, Mayor of Peterborough
 Gurminder Thind (born 1984), football player
 Curtis Thom (born 1986), wheelchair racer and coach, Paralympian
 Delisha Thomas, singer-songwriter
 Fletcher Stewart Thomas (1897–1957), Member of Provincial Parliament for Elgin
 Denyse Thomasos (1964–2012), Trinidadian-Canadian abstract artist
 William Thompson (1786–1860), farmer, Militia member in the War of 1812 and Upper Canada Rebellion, politician
 Matt Tierney (born 1996), rugby union player
 Rick Titus (born 1969), retired footballer
 Kate Todd, actress (Radio Free Roscoe), singer
 Philip Tomasino (born 2001), ice hockey forward
 Brandon Toste (born 2002), figure skater
 Dave Toycen, O Ont, World Vision Canada
 Lauren Toyota, television personality
 T. J. Trevelyan, DEL ice hockey player
 Michael Trotta (born ), Bandidos motorcycle member killed in the Shedden massacre, 2006
 Masami Tsuruoka (1929–2014), O. Ont., karate instructor, known as "The Father of Canadian Karate"
 Barbara Turnbull, journalist and activist for people with disabilities

U

 Stella Umeh (born 1975), artistic gymnast, 1992 Olympics
 Jim Unger, cartoonist, Herman
 Brent Urban (born 1991), NFL football player

V

 Rechie Valdez (born ), Member of Parliament
 Jamie Vanderbeken (born 1987), NBL basketball player
 Diana Van der Vlis (1935–2001), actress
 Debbie Van Kiekebelt (born 1954), sports broadcaster, athlete
 David Velastegui (born 1991), soccer player
 Paul Vermeersch, poet
 Harry Vetro (born 1995), drummer
 Sara Villani (born 1996), bobsledder
 Rebecca Vint (born 1992), ice hockey player
 David Visentin, realtor, television personality
 Owen von Richter (born 1975), swimming, men's 400 individual medley

W

 Eric Walters, C.M. (born 1957), author
 Gary Waterman, head coach for St. Francis Xavier University's football team
 Rob Wells, producer, songwriter
 Emery Welshman (born 1991), MLS soccer player for Real Salt Lake
 Daria Werbowy (born 1983), supermodel
 Fred J. White (1886–1967), Alberta MLA, labour activist
 Solomon White (1836–1911), ran a winery, provincial politician
 Natalie Wideman (born 1992), softball player, Olympian
 Aileen Williams (1924–2015), Black-Canadian activist
 Klaus Wilmsmeyer (born 1967), former National Football League player for the San Francisco 49ers, New Orleans Saints and Miami Dolphins
 Mike Wilner (born 1970), radio broadcaster
 John Tuzo Wilson (1908–1993), geophysicist 
 Greg Wojt (born 1985), football player
 Teneca Wolfe-Bell (born 1987), female Black jockey, perhaps the first to win a race in North America
 Mike Wolfs (born 1970), Olympic sailor
 Ted Woloshyn (born 1953), columnist, former talk radio host
 Erin Woodley (born 1972), Olympic synchronized swimmer
 Anthony Whyte (born 1996), League1 Ontario and Guyanese national football player
 Daniel Whyte (born 1994), League1 Ontario and Guyanese national football player

X

 Phil X (born 1966, Philip Xenidis), Bon Jovi guitarist and songwriter

Y

 Sura Yekka (born 1997), soccer, Canadian national team
 Michael Young (born 1994), bobsledder

Z

 Marcel Zajac (born 1998), soccer player
 Mark Zubek, record producer, jazz musician

See also
 List of people from Brampton
 List of people from Caledon, Ontario

References

Mississauga
Mississauga